Belloy is a ghost town in Alberta, Canada within Birch Hills County.

It is located along the Grande Prairie-Grande Cache Railway tracks, north of Alberta Highway 49, between Wanham and Girouxville. It is part of census division No. 19 and is administered by Birch Hills County.

The community has the name of one Octavie Belloy, an opera singer who entertained Belgian troops.

Agriculture is the main activity in the community, which was built around cattle farming. Services for the oil and gas industry are another part of the economy.

Geography 
The community lies in the Peace River Country of northern Alberta, in the Birch Hills south of the Peace River.

The settlement gives the name to the Belloy Formation, a stratigraphical unit of the Western Canadian Sedimentary Basin.

See also 
List of communities in Alberta
List of ghost towns in Alberta

References

External links 
Ghost Towns of Canada. Belloy, Alberta

Localities in Birch Hills County
Ghost towns in Alberta